Double agent (or "Shtula", in Hebrew שתולה) is an five-part Israeli documentary series. The series was produced by the head of the Arab affairs desk at the Israeli Channel 13, Zvi Yehezkeli. Yehezkali in collaboration with the organization "Ad Kan" reveals authentic documentation about what goes on behind the scenes of the human rights organizations operating in the Palestinian Authority, and shows how their war of consciousness against Israel is conducted.

The series introduces R (pseudonym), a 32-year-old pro-Palestinian Swedish girl who came to Israel as a tourist to study architecture, and during her stay in Israel she meets a man from the  Eli settlement who explains to her the Israeli angle to the Israeli-Palestinian conflict.

The Swedish girl stirs within the Palestinian organizations and actually becomes an intelligence agent. After a year, she meets with members of the terrorist organization Hamas. Hamas officials reveal to her the fundraising mechanism, and the connection between the Muslim Brotherhood and the Hamas headquarters in Europe and human rights organizations, which indicates that human rights organizations such as BDS are operated by Hamas personnel.

R was operated by the "Ad Kan" organization in the five years preceding the production of the series.

The documentation on which the series is built includes 3000 hours of photography.

References

Israeli documentary films
Israeli television series